This page describes the qualification procedure for FIBA EuroBasket 2011.

Qualified teams
Ten teams have secured their places at the EuroBasket 2011 before the qualifications. Seven teams have qualified through the Qualifying Round, five through FIBA Europe expansion of the tournament, and two more team have qualified through the Additional Qualifying Round.

Qualified as the host nation:
 

Qualified through participation at the 2010 FIBA World Championship
 
 
 
 
 
 
 
 
 

Qualified through the Qualifying Round
 
 
 
 
 

Qualified through FIBA Europe decision on 5 September 2010
 
 
 
 
 
 
 

Qualified through the Additional Qualifying Round

Qualification format 
The Qualifying Round was held from 2 August 2010 to 29 August 2010. The draw for the Qualifying Round was held on 16 January 2010 in Munich, Germany. There were three groups of five teams. The best four teams in each group qualified for EuroBasket 2011.

The three remaining teams played an Additional Qualifying Round for the last two places in EuroBasket 2011.

Expansion of EuroBasket 2011 
Originally, the final tournament was to have included 16 teams. However, on 5 September 2010, after the Qualifying Round had concluded, FIBA Europe decided to expand the Final to 24 teams, and therefore 12 teams qualified instead of 5.

Qualifying round

Qualification groups 
The draw for the Qualifying Round was held on 16 January 2010 in Munich, Germany.

Group A 

Note: All times are local

Group B 

Note: All times are local

Group C 

Note: All times are local

Additional Qualifying Round 
The three remaining teams played an Additional Qualifying Round for the last two places in the EuroBasket 2011.

References

External links 
 Results and news from FIBA Europe official website

qualification
2010–11 in European basketball
2011–12 in European basketball
2011